Republika Srpska (also known as Republic of Srpska) is one of the two entities of Bosnia and Herzegovina, the other being the Federation of Bosnia and Herzegovina. It is located in the north and east of the country. Its largest city and administrative centre is Banja Luka, lying on the Vrbas river.
		  	 	
Republika Srpska was formed in 1992 at the outset of the Bosnian War with the stated intent to safeguard the interests of the Serbs of Bosnia and Herzegovina. The war saw the expulsion of the vast majority of Croats and Bosniaks from the territory claimed by Republika Srpska and an inflow of Serbs expelled from Federation of Bosnia and Herzegovina. Following the Dayton Agreement of 1995, Republika Srpska was recognised as an entity within Bosnia and Herzegovina. Today most of Bosnia and Herzegovina's Serb population lives in Republika Srpska. 
	
Republika Srpska is a parliamentary-style government, with the National Assembly holding legislative power within the entity. Republika Srpska is relatively centralised, although it is split into 64 municipalities called opštine. The legislature holds 83 seats, and the current session is the tenth since its founding.

Name

	 
In the name ,  is a noun derived from the ethnonym of the Serbs with a different suffix than  ‘Serbia’.
In Serbian, many names of countries are formed with the  suffix (e.g.  ‘Bulgaria’,  ‘Denmark’,  ‘Finland’,  ‘Croatia’,  ‘Ireland’,  ‘Turkey’).
An analogous English formation would be Serbland (which has been used sporadically).
Since the suffix  originally forms adjectives and the country names of this type are nominalisations,  has often been misunderstood to mean ‘Serb Republic’.
However, the noun  is often used without  as a stand-alone noun in Serbian, e.g. in the names of the political party United Srpska , of the newspaper , of the postal service  or of the entity's writers’ association .
As a proper noun,  is always capitalised in Serbian, whereas postponed adjectives in names and titles are not (cf. the cultural organisation , with a small s in the adjective  ‘Serbian’).
The government uses the name “Republic of Srpska” in English.

Although  is variously glossed in English as “Serb Republic”, “Bosnian Serb Republic”, or “Republic of Srpska”, the Constitution of Bosnia and Herzegovina and English-language news sources such as the BBC, The New York Times, and The Guardian generally refer to the entity by its transliteration.

According to Glas Srpske, a Banja Luka daily, the modern entity's name was created by its first minister of culture, Ljubomir Zuković.

History

Early history 

Archaeological evidence in Republika Srpska, as well as bordering areas of Bosnia and Herzegovina, attest to pronounced human activity in the Paleolithic. Specifically, in 1976, near the modern-day town of Stolac in the then relatively hospitable Neretva basin, archaeological artifacts in the form of cave engravings in Badanj and deer bones in the area were discovered to show hunter-gatherer activity from as far back as 14,000–10,000 BC. Within the wider region of Herzegovina, similar discoveries tie the region's early activities to Montenegro and coastal Croatia.
 
With the Neolithic, however, came more permanent settlement. Naturally, this occurred along the rivers of Bosnia and Herzegovina as farming spread from the southeast; most notably, the Butmir culture developed near today's East Sarajevo on the river Bosna. A variety of idols, mostly of female character, were found in the Butmir site, along with dugouts.
 
With the Indo-European migrations of the Bronze Age came the first use of metal tools in the region. Along with this came the construction of burial mounds—tumuli, or kurgans. Remains of these mounds can be found in northwestern Bosnia near Prijedor, testament to not only denser settlement in the northern core of today's Republika Srpska but also Bronze Age relics.
 
With the influx of the Iron Age, the Glasinac culture, developing near Sokolac in eastern Republika Srpska, was one of the most important of the country's long-standing Indo-European inhabitants, the Illyrians. Later, these Illyrians—the Autariatae—were influenced by the Celts after the Gallic invasion of the Balkans.

Roman period 

With the end of the Illyrian Wars, most of Bosnia and Herzegovina came under Roman control within the province of Illyricum. In this period, the Romans consolidated the region through the construction of a dense road network and the Romanisation of the local population. Among these roads was the Via Argentaria, or 'Silver Way', which transported silver from the eastern mines of Bosnia to Roman population centres. Modern placenames, such as the Una and Sana rivers in the northwest, have Latin origins, meaning "the one" and "the healthy", respectively. This rule was not uninterrupted, however; with the suppression of the once-dominant Illyrian population came revolts such as the Bellum Batonianum. After 20 AD, however, the entirety of the country was conquered by the Romans and it was split between Pannonia and Dalmatia. The most prominent Roman city in Bosnia was the relatively small Servitium, near modern-day Gradiška in the northern part of the entity.
 
Christianity spread to the region relatively late at least partially due to the countryside's mountainous nature and its lack of large settlements. In the fourth century, however, the country began to be Christianised en masse. With the split of the Western and Eastern Roman Empires in 395, modern-day Republika Srpska fell under the Western Roman Empire. Testament to its and Bosnia and Herzegovina's later religious polarisation, it was later conquered as a frontier of the Eastern Roman Empire, a harbinger for religious division to come.

Middle Ages 

With the loosening of Roman grip on the region came the Migration Period which, given Republika Srpska's position in southeastern Europe, involved a wide variety of peoples. Among the first was the invasion of Germanic peoples from the east and north, and the territory became a part of the Ostrogothic Kingdom in 476.
 
By 535, the territory was taken once again by the Byzantine Empire. At this time, the Empire's grip was once again relatively loose and Slavs invaded the surrounding area. Modern-day Republika Srpska was therefore split between the mediaeval Kingdom of Croatia and, according to De Administrando Imperio, mediaeval Serbian županije, including, Bosna, Zachlumia, Travunija, and Serbia, then including land in eastern Bosnia. Parts of present-day Srpska were locations of settlement of the original White Serb people.
 

The entirety of Bosnia became part of the Hungarian Crown Lands by the end of the 11th century. The area was known under Hungarian rule as the Banate of Bosnia. Later, however, with the rule of Ban Kulin, who is regarded as the founder of Bosnia, the region became de facto independent. In 1377, the Banate of Bosnia became the medieval Kingdom of Bosnia, under Tvrtko I of House of Kotromanić. The capitals of the kingdom were all located in its centre, while the northern periphery remained under nominal Hungarian rule as the region of Usora. Architectural legacies from this period include Kastel Fortress in Banja Luka,the fortress of Doboj as well as castles, churches, and monasteries across the country.
 
With the growth of the Ottoman Empire, Stefan Tomašević, the last Kotromanić ruler, surrendered Bosnia and Serbia to Ottoman tributary status. A Catholic, he was unpopular among the Orthodox population of Serbia, as well as the members of the Bosnian Church. Refusing to pay tribute to Mehmed the Conqueror, King Stefan was executed and much of Bosnia fell under the direct Ottoman rule in 1463 as the Eyalet of Bosnia. The entirety of the country fell in 1482, with the founding of the Sanjak of Herzegovina.

16th to 19th centuries 

Ottoman rule in modern-day Republika Srpska saw another addition to its religious fabric—Islam. Members of the Bosnian Church, as well as many Orthodox and Catholic Bosnians, gradually converted to Islam. Ottoman rule left a profound architectural legacy in Bosnia and Herzegovina and Republika Srpska. The most famous mosque from this period is the Ferhadija mosque, located in Banja Luka. In addition, the subject of Ivo Andrić's book The Bridge on the Drina, Mehmed Paša Sokolović Bridge in Višegrad, was constructed by Mimar Sinan, the most famous Ottoman architect, in 1577, for Grand Vizier Sokollu Mehmed Pasha. Years earlier, the same Grand Vizier was born into an Orthodox family in a small town in Bosnia and taken from his parents as a child for upbringing as a janissary. His bridge is a symbol of the religious and cultural spans—and eventually conflict—that characterise Republika Srpska and Bosnia and Herzegovina.
 
With the Ottoman-Habsburg conflicts of the late 17th and 18th centuries, parts of northern Republika Srpska became a part of the Habsburg Empire for relatively short periods of time. Rule was more permanent following Austro-Hungarian invasion in 1878. Characterised by economic and social development not seen in the by-then backwards Ottoman Empire, Austro-Hungarian rule was welcomed by many. However, many Muslims left Bosnia, leaving Serbs as the majority in the entirety of the Condominium.

20th century 

With the assassination of Archduke Franz Ferdinand of Austria, carried out by Bosnian Serb Gavrilo Princip, a member of the Yugoslavist Mlada Bosna, World War I broke out in 1914. Following the war, the territory of modern-day Republika Srpska was incorporated into the Vrbas, Drina, and Zeta banovinas of the Kingdom of Serbs, Croats, and Slovenes, renamed Yugoslavia in 1929.
 
Following the outbreak of World War II and the invasion of Yugoslavia in 1941, Republika Srpska fell under the rule of the Nazi puppet state, The Independent State of Croatia. Around 300,000 Serbs are estimated to have died under the Ustashe regime as a result of their genocide campaign; a slew of massacres, as well as the use of a variety of concentration and extermination camps, took place in Republika Srpska during the war. The Jasenovac concentration camp, located in modern-day Croatia, was the site of the deaths of some 100,000 people, about 52,000 of which were Serbs. Massacres also occurred at Garavice and Kruščica concentration camp in the eastern part of Bosnia. The regime systematically and brutally massacred Serbs in villages in the countryside, using a variety of tools. The scale of the violence meant that approximately every sixth Serb living in Bosnia-Herzegovina was the victim of a massacre and virtually every Serb had a family member that was killed in the war, mostly by the Ustaše. An estimated 209,000 Serbs or 16.9% of its Bosnia population were killed on the territory of Bosnia–Herzegovina during the war. Today, monuments honouring these victims can be found across Republika Srpska and Bosnia and Herzegovina.
 
The Yugoslav royalist Chetniks, a guerilla force that engaged in tactical or selective collaboration with the occupying forces for almost all of the war, pursued genocide against Croats and Bosniaks, which included thousands of Croat and Muslim civilians killed on the territory of modern-day Republika Srpska. The Chetniks killed an estimated 50,000 to 68,000 Muslims and Croats. About 300 villages and small towns were destroyed, along with a large number of mosques and Catholic churches.
 
During the entire course of WWII in Yugoslavia, 64.1% of all Bosnian Partisans were Serbs.
 
After World War II came a period of relative peace and economic development. Ljubija mine and companies like Agrokomerc played a vital role in much of the economic development of the Socialist Republic of Bosnia and Herzegovina. Literacy rates increased greatly, and the University of Banja Luka was founded in 1975.

Bosnian War

Bosnian War and the proclamation of the Republika Srpska

Representatives of main political parties and some other national organisations and institutions of Serb people in Bosnia and Herzegovina met on 13 October 1990 in Banja Luka and formed the 'Serbian National Council of Bosnia and Herzegovina' as a Serb political body. In a session on 14–15 October 1991, the People's Assembly of Bosnia and Herzegovina, then part of the Socialist Federal Republic of Yugoslavia, approved the 'Memorandum on Sovereignty', as had already been done by Slovenia and Croatia, as a way to proclaim independence from the rest of Yugoslavia. The memorandum was adopted despite opposition from 83 Serb deputies belonging to the Serb Democratic Party (most of the Serb parliamentary representatives) as well as the Serbian Renewal Movement and the Union of Reform Forces, who regarded the move as illegal.

On 24 October 1991, the Serb deputies formed the Assembly of the Serb People in Bosnia and Herzegovina (Skupština srpskog naroda u Bosni i Hercegovini) to be the highest representative and legislative body of the Bosnian Serb population, ending the tripartite coalition.

The Union of Reform Forces soon ceased to exist but its members remained in the assembly as the Independent Members of Parliament Caucus. The assembly undertook to address the achievement of equality between the Serbs and other peoples and the protection of the Serbs' interests, which they contended had been jeopardised by decisions of the Bosnian parliament. On 9 January 1992, the assembly proclaimed the Republic of the Serb People of Bosnia and Herzegovina, declaring it part of Yugoslavia.

On 28 February 1992, the assembly adopted the Constitution of the Serbian Republic of Bosnia and Herzegovina (the name adopted instead of the previous Republika srpskog naroda Bosne i Hercegovine), which would include districts, municipalities, and regions where Serbs were the majority and also those where they had allegedly become a minority because of persecution during World War II. The republic was part of Yugoslavia and could enter into union with political bodies representing other peoples of Bosnia and Herzegovina.

The Bosnian parliament, without its Serb deputies, held a referendum on the independence of Bosnia and Herzegovina on 29 February and 1 March 1992, but most Serbs boycotted it since the assembly had previously (9–10 November 1991) held a plebiscite in the Serb regions, 96% having opted for membership of the Yugoslav federation formed by Serbia and Montenegro.
The referendum had a 64% turnout and 92.7% or 99% (according to different sources) voted for independence. On 6 March the Bosnian parliament promulgated the results of the referendum, proclaiming the republic's independence from Yugoslavia. The republic's independence was recognised by the European Community on 6 April 1992 and by the United States on 7 April. On the same day the Serbs' assembly in session in Banja Luka declared a severance of governmental ties with Bosnia and Herzegovina. The name Republika Srpska was adopted on 12 August 1992.

The political controversy escalated into the Bosnian War, which would last until the autumn of 1995.

The war was ended by the General Framework Agreement for Peace in Bosnia and Herzegovina, reached at Wright-Patterson Air Force Base near Dayton, Ohio, on 21 November and formally signed in Paris on 14 December 1995. Annex 4 of the Agreement is the current Constitution of Bosnia and Herzegovina, recognising Republika Srpska as one of its two main political-territorial divisions and defining the governmental functions and powers of the two entities. The boundary lines between the entities were delineated in Annex 2 of the Agreement.

Between 1992 and 2008, the Constitution of Republika Srpska was amended 121 times. Article 1 states that Republika Srpska is a territorially unified, indivisible, and inalienable constitutional and legal entity that shall perform its constitutional, legislative, executive, and judicial functions independently.

Impact of war
The war in Bosnia and Herzegovina resulted in major changes in the country, some of which were quantified in a 1998 UNESCO report. Some two million people, about half the country's population, were displaced. In 1996 there were some 435,346 ethnic Serb refugees from the Federation in Republika Srpska, while another 197,925 had gone to Serbia. In 1991, 27% of the non-agricultural labour force was unemployed in Bosnia and this number increased due to the war. By 2009, the unemployment rate in Bosnia and Herzegovina was estimated at 29%, according to the CIA's The World Factbook. Republika Srpska's population of Serbs had increased by 547,741 due to the influx of ethnic Serb refugees from the Federation of Bosnia and Herzegovina and the former unrecognised state of the Republic of Serbian Krajina in the new Republic of Croatia.

In Eastern Bosnia, Bosnian Serbs besieged the town of Srebrenica, among others. Srebrenica was declared a UN 'Safe Area' in 1993 and it served as an enclave for Muslim refugees for the final years of the Bosnian War. In the middle of July 1995, more than 8,000 Muslim Bosniaks, mainly men and boys, in and around the town of Srebrenica, were killed in what became known as the Srebrenica massacre, which was subsequently designated as an act of genocide by the International Criminal Tribunal for the former Yugoslavia and the International Court of Justice.

Acts of ethnic cleansing against the non-Serb populations reduced the numbers of other groups. Serb police, soldiers, and irregulars attacked Muslims and Croats, and burned and looted their homes. Some were killed on the spot; others were rounded up and killed elsewhere, or forced to flee. The number of Croats was reduced by 135,386 (the majority of the pre-war population), and the number of Bosniaks by some 434,144. Some 136,000 of approximately 496,000 Bosniak refugees forced to flee the territory of what is now Republika Srpska have since returned home.

, 40% of Bosniaks and 8.5% of Croats had returned to Republika Srpska, while 14% of Serbs who left their homes in territories controlled by Bosniaks or Croats, also returned to their pre-war communities.

In the early 2000s, discrimination against non-Serbs was alleged by NGOs and the Helsinki Commission. The International Crisis Group reported in 2002 that in some parts of Republika Srpska a non-Serb returnee is ten times more likely to be the victim of violent crime than a local Serb. The Helsinki Commission, in a 2001 statement on 'Tolerance and Non-Discrimination', pointed at violence against non-Serbs, stating that in the cities of Banja Luka and Trebinje, mobs attacked people who sought to lay foundations for new mosques.

Non-Serbs have reported continuing difficulties in returning to their original homes and the assembly has a poor record of cooperation in apprehending individuals indicted for war crimes, crimes against humanity, and genocide.

Organisations such as the Society for Threatened Peoples, reporting to the United Nations Human Rights Council in 2008, have made claims of discrimination against non-Serb refugees in Republika Srpska, particularly areas with high unemployment in the Drina Valley such as Srebrenica, Bratunac, Višegrad, and Foča.

According to the Ministry for Human Rights and Refugees of Bosnia and Herzegovina, European Union Police Mission, UNHCR, and other international organisations, security in both Republika Srpska and the Federation of Bosnia and Herzegovina in 2015 was satisfactory.

Politics

According to its constitution, Republika Srpska has its own president, legislature (the 83-member unicameral National Assembly of Republika Srpska), executive government, police force, court system, customs service (under the state-level customs service), and postal service. It also has official symbols, including a coat of arms, a flag (a variant of the Serbian flag without the coat of arms displayed) and its entity anthem. The Constitutional Law on the Coat of Arms and Anthem of Republika Srpska was ruled not in concordance with the Constitution of Bosnia and Herzegovina as it states that those symbols 'represent the statehood of Republika Srpska' and are used 'in accordance with moral norms of the Serb people'. According to the Constitutional Court's decision, the Law was to be corrected by September 2006. Republika Srpska later changed its emblem.

Although the constitution names Sarajevo as the capital of Republika Srpska, the northwestern city of Banja Luka is the headquarters of most of the institutions of government, including the parliament, and is, therefore, the de facto capital. After the war, Republika Srpska retained its army, but in August 2005, the parliament consented to transfer control of Army of Republika Srpska to a state-level ministry and abolish the entity's defence ministry and army by 1 January 2006. These reforms were required by NATO as a precondition of Bosnia and Herzegovina's admission to the Partnership for Peace programme. Bosnia and Herzegovina joined the programme in December 2006.

Geography

Situated in Southeast Europe, Republika Srpska is located on the Balkan Peninsula, with its northern extents reaching into the Pannonian Basin. Republika Srpska lies between latitudes 42° and 46° N and longitudes 16° and 20° E. The entity is split into two main parts by the Brčko District; a hilly western part and a more varied eastern part, with high mountains in the south and flat, fertile farmland in the north. Republika Srpska, unlike its counterpart entity, is landlocked.

Like the rest of Bosnia and Herzegovina, Republika Srpska is split into a Bosnian region in the north and a Herzegovinian region in the far south. Within these two macroregions exist smaller geographical regions, from the forested hills of Bosanska Krajina in the northwest to the fertile plains of Semberija in the northeast.

Republika Srpska, if it were a country, would be 146th largest in the world. Elevation varies greatly, with Maglić, a peak in the Dinaric Alps near Montenegro, reaching , and parts nearer the Adriatic going down to sea level. The largest and most popular ski resort in Bosnia and Herzegovina is situated on the slopes of the mountain Jahorina, in the eastern part of the entity. Other major mountains in Republika Srpska include Volujak, Zelengora, Lelija, Lebršnik, Crvanj, Orjen, Klekovača, Vitorog, Kozara, Romanija, Treskavica and Trebević.

Boundary
Republika Srpska shares international borders with Croatia to the north, Serbia to the east, and Montenegro to the southeast. Within Bosnia and Herzegovina, the Inter-Entity Boundary Line (IEBL) marks Republika Srpska's administrative division with the Federation of Bosnia and Herzegovina, and essentially follows the front lines at the end of the Bosnian War with some adjustments (most importantly in the western part of the country and around Sarajevo) as defined by the Dayton Agreement. The total length of the IEBL is approximately  km. The IEBL is an administrative demarcation uncontrolled by military or police and there is free movement across it.

Forests 
Republika Srpska is one of the most forested areas in Europe, with over 50% of its area consisting of forest cover. Perućica is one of the last old-growth forests in Europe.

Two densely-wooded national parks—Sutjeska National Park and Kozara National Park—are located in the entity.

Waters

Most rivers belong to the Black Sea drainage basin. The principal rivers are the Sava, a tributary of the Danube that forms the northern boundary with Croatia; the Bosna, Vrbas, Sana and Una, which all flow north and empty into the Sava; the Drina, which flows north and forms a significant part of the eastern boundary with Serbia, and is also a tributary of the Sava. The Trebišnjica is one of the longest sinking rivers in the world. It belongs to the Adriatic Sea drainage basin. The most important lakes are Bileća Lake, Lake Bardača (which includes a protected wetland area) and Balkana Lake.

National Parks

Demographics

, Republika Srpska (excluding the Brčko District) has a total population of 1,228,423 and a population density of 49.9 inhabitants per square kilometre; both of these figures are much lower than in Republika Srpska's counterpart entity, the Federation of Bosnia and Herzegovina. Republika Srpska comprises 48% of the land area of Bosnia and Herzegovina, and is home to 34.79% of the country's total population. The overall life expectancy in Republika Srpska at birth was 77.15 years in 2019.

The total fertility rate in Republika Srpska is, as of 2019, 1.34 children per mother—one of the world's lowest. In 2019, the total number of live births, according to the Institute of Statistics of Republika Srpska (RZS), was 9,274. That same year, the number of deaths was 15,081, resulting in a natural population decrease for 5,807 inhabitants. Along with this natural population decrease, the entity faces considerable emigration. A large number of people have left the entity in recent years for the nearby European Union and beyond.

Education 

Literacy in Republika Srpska stands at 96.8 percent as of 2013. Free primary education is provided as a right to all people in Republika Srpska and Bosnia and Herzegovina. There are 187 primary schools in addition to 11 music schools and 4 centres of education for students with learning disabilities. Secondary education exists in three main channels: three-year vocational schools, four-year technical schools, and four-year grammar schools (gimnazije). Ten independent grammar schools exist, while an additional 30 are integrated into other schools. Music schools offer another option for students to continue their education following primary school.

The oldest and largest public university in Republika Srpska is the University of Banja Luka, which was established in 1975. The second of two public universities in Republika Srpska is University of East Sarajevo. After the end of the Yugoslav wars several private institutions of higher education were established, including: American University in Bosnia and Herzegovina, Slobomir University,  and University Sinergija. The Academy of Sciences and Arts of Republika Srpska, founded in 1996, is the highest representative institution of science and art in Republika Srpska. National and University Library of Republika Srpska is a national library, located in Banja Luka. The Museum of Contemporary Art (MSURS) houses a collection of Yugoslav and international art and is located in Banja Luka.

Ethnic groups

Healthcare
The health care system of Republic of Srpska is intended to provide organized and planned health care to the population on its territory, both in public and private health care institutions. Health care activities are performed by health care workers and associates under the conditions and in the manner primarily prescribed by law and regulations, adopted on the basis, and in accordance with, the Law on Health Care of the Republic of Srpska.

The public sector of Srpska includes 54 health centers, along with family medicine clinics, 11 hospitals, 4 specialised hospitals, 1 clinical centre and 7 institutes.

Stationary treatment is provided in hospitals located in Derventa and Prnjavor. Hospitals specialised for physical medicine and rehabilitation are "Mlječanica" in Kozarska Dubica and Institute "Dr Miroslav Zotović" in Banja Luka. Patients with mental illnesses are treated in Institute for Forensic Psychiatry Sokolac, which is the first and only institution of this type in BiH, and Hospital for Chronic Psychiatric Patients Modriča.

University hospitals are located in Foča and Banja Luka. The University Clinical Center of Republika Srpska (UCC RS) is the largest and most important public health institution in Republika Srpska. The main activity of the University Clinical Center is hospital treatment (admission, diagnosis and care) of patients at the secondary and tertiary level of health care. It consists of 21 clinics, 6 institutes and 10 services.

Religion
Republika Srpska has no official religion. Freedom of religion is a right defined by the Constitution of Republika Srpska, which provides for legal equality of all people, irrespective of religious belief.

According to the 2013 census, around 85% of the residents of Republika Srpska identify as Christian. Members of the Serbian Orthodox Church form the largest religious group, accounting for a little less than 83% of the population, followed by followers of Islam and Roman Catholicism. 0.59% of people describe themselves as atheist or agnostic.Religion plays an important role in ethnic identification in Republika Srpska. Serbs generally identify as followers of Eastern Orthodoxy, Croats as followers of the Catholic Church, and Bosniaks as followers of Islam. Religious architecture takes on a similarly diverse character in the entity, with its mix of mosques and churches.

Economy

Republika Srpska uses the Bosnia and Herzegovina convertible mark (KM). The currency is pegged to the euro at a unit rate of 1.95583 convertible marks. Along with the rest of Bosnia and Herzegovina, Republika Srpska is classified as an upper-middle income economy by the United Nations. According to the IRBRS, the entity's development bank, Republika Srpska's nominal GDP per capita is 8,739 km (€4,457) as of 2017.

Republika Srpska's corporate tax rate is lower than that of the Federation of Bosnia and Herzegovina, and is among the lowest in the region.

In November 2020 governments of Serbia and Srpska announced construction of three hydropower plants on the Drina estimated at EUR 520 million.

External trade

Taxation and salaries

Since 2001, Republika Srpska initiated significant reforms in the sector of the tax system, which lowered the tax burden to 28.6%, one of the lowest in the region. The 10% rate of capital gains tax and income tax are among the lowest in Europe. VAT has been introduced in 2006. These tax advantages have led to some companies moving their business to Republika Srpska from the other entity.

As of 2018, there are 266,309 employed people within legal entities in Republika Srpska. The average net wage, according to the Institute of Statistics of Republika Srpska (RZS), is 896 km (€458) per month as of February 2019, a nominal growth of 1.0% compared to the previous month.

Transport 

Transport and telecommunications infrastructure in Republika Srpska is regulated by Ministry of Transport and Communications. Traffic infrastructure includes roads, railways, railway stations, airports, waterways, ports on the whole territory of Republika Srpska, while telecommunication infrastructure includes telephony, telegraphy, optical cables, terrestrial communication stations, traffic telematics and others.

State-owned companies like Republika Srpska Railways, Pošte Srpske, Republika Srpska Roads are in charge of maintaining traffic on the territory.

The basic road traffic network in Srpska includes 4,192 kilometers of public roads, of which 1,781 km of trunk roads and 2,183 km of regional roads. There are currently two highways in Republika Srpska: Gradiška - Banja Luka highway, and the "9th January highway" (Banja Luka - Doboj). Arterial highways in Srpska which are a part of the International E-road network are:

 European road E761 (M5): (Federation of BiH) — Istočno Sarajevo — Podromanija — Rogatica — Ustiprača — Višegrad — Vardište/Kotroman (Serbia)
  European route E761 (M5): (Federation BiH) — Velečevo — Čađavica — Rogolji — Mrkonjić Grad — Jezero — (Federation of BiH)
  European route E73 (M17): (Croatia) Slavonski Šamac — Modriča — Rudanka — Doboj — Karuše — (Federation of BiH)
  European route E661 (M16): (Croatia) Stara Gradiška — Laktaši — Banja Luka — Karanovac — Ugar — (Federation of BiH)
  European route E762 (M18): (Federation of BiH) — Istočno Sarajevo — Trnovo — Foča — Hum/Šćepan Polje (Montenegro)

The total length of the regular gauge railway in Srpska is 425 km. Republika Srpska Railways transports around 1 million passengers and 5 million tons of goods each year. The international code of the Republika Srpska Railways is 0044.

Tourism 

Some types of tourism in the Republic of Srpska are: mountain, spa, religious, ethno-tourism and ecotourism.

Republika Srpska has rich but fragmented natural resources. Popular mountains include: Zelengora, Treskavica, Jahorina, Romanija, as well as Grmeč, Kozara, Ozren  and many others, with rich flora and hunting grounds.

Jahorina ski resort is a mountain resort and the largest and most popular winter tourism resort in the country. The ski resort is situated on the slopes of Jahorina mountain in Dinaric Alps. The Jahorina ski resort hosted alpine skiing competitions during the 1984 Winter Olympics.

Royal village Kontromanićevo near Doboj and Stanišići are popular destinations for ethno-tourism.
Andrićgrad is a tourist complex inspired by the works of Nobel Prize winner Ivo Andrić, located on Drina near Višegrad. It is made of stone with around fifty object, including a local theatre, cinema, art gallery, church, Andrić's institute, hotels and various shops.

Several rivers with clear water and potential for fishing are located in Srpska, such as Una, Sana, Tara, Drina and Ukrina.

The best known spas in Srpska are Vrućića, Dvorovi, Guber, Laktaši, Lješljani, Mlječanica and Višegrad spa.

An important annual event of Serbs from the region of Bosanska Krajina is Corrida of Grmeč. So far 248 bullfighting events have been held at Grmeč.

External relations
In September 2006, Republika Srpska officials signed a 'special ties agreement' with Serbia aimed at promoting economic and institutional cooperation between Serbia and Republika Srpska. The accord was signed by Serbia's President Boris Tadić and Prime Minister Vojislav Koštunica, former Republika Srpska President Dragan Čavić, and Republika Srpska Prime Minister Milorad Dodik.

Representative offices

In February 2009, Republika Srpska opened a representative office in Brussels. While European Union representatives were not present at the ceremony, top Republika Srpska officials attended the event, saying it would advance their economic, political and cultural relations with the EU. This notion has been strongly condemned by Bosniak leaders, saying that this is further proof of Republika Srpska distancing itself from Bosnia and Herzegovina. The president of Republika Srpska, Rajko Kuzmanović, told reporters that this move did not jeopardise Republika Srpska's place within Bosnia and Herzegovina. He added that Republika Srpska merely used its constitutional right 'to open up a representation office in the centre of developments of European relevance'. Republika Srpska maintains official offices in Belgrade, Moscow, Stuttgart, Jerusalem, Thessaloniki, Washington D.C., Brussels, and Vienna.

Culture 
The Academy of Sciences and Arts of Republika Srpska is the most important scientific, cultural, working and representative institution of Republika Srpska. The task of this academic institution is to develop, promote and encourage scientific and artistic activity. The academy is an institution of special national interest for the Republika Srpska.

An important carrier of the development of dramatic art in Banja Luka and in the whole region is the National Theater of the Republic of Srpska, which has eighty full-time employees and, within the ensemble of actors themselves, twenty-six dramatic artists. One of the most important and certainly the most visited cultural events in the city is the Theater Fest, which is held every year in this theater, with the participation of numerous ensembles of domestic and foreign actors.

The National and University Library of Republika Srpska is the central library of the University of Banja Luka, the main library of all public universities in Republika Srpska and the umbrella and central national library of Republika Srpska.

The Republic Institute for the Protection of Cultural, Historical and Natural Heritage is the official administrative institution of the Republika Srpska and an organization within the Ministry of Education and Culture of the Republika Srpska. The Institute registers, protects and maintains a central register of cultural, historical and natural monuments throughout the territory of the Republika Srpska.

In 1993, the Association of Serbian Writers was founded in Jahorina, under the chairmanship of professor and politician Nikola Koljevic. Since 2003, the president of the association has been Zoran Kostic, who moved its headquarters from Serbian Sarajevo to Banja Luka. The president of the Sarajevo-Romanija-Drina branch is Nedeljko Zelenovic.

The founding assembly of the Association of Historians of the Republic of Srpska "Milorad Ekmecic" was held in Banja Luka in December 2015 . Draga Mastilović, Dean of the Faculty of Philosophy at the University of East Sarajevo, was elected president . The objectives of the Association are the improvement of scientific research activities in the field of historical science in the Republic of Srpska and dissemination of these results, improvement of history teaching and professional development of teaching staff.

Sport
Sport in Republika Srpska is managed by the entity's Ministry of Youth, Family, and Sport. The most popular sports in the entity include basketball, football, and volleyball.
The most popular football club, and generally the largest sports organization, is FK Borac Banja Luka. FK Borac has, especially with regard to the former Yugoslavia, experienced considerable success: it won the Premier League of Bosnia and Herzegovina in 2011, the Bosnia and Herzegovina Cup in 2010, the Yugoslav Cup in 1988, and the Central European Cup in 1992, its last year. Other popular football clubs include FK Rudar Prijedor, FK Radnik Bijeljina, and FK Leotar, though these clubs face a considerable loss of talent to larger clubs of Serbia, Croatia, and the capital of Bosnia and Herzegovina, Sarajevo.

The oldest basketball club in Bosnia and Herzegovina, KK Borac, was founded in Banja Luka in 1947. The most successful sportspeoples born on the territory of present-day Republika Srpska are football players Tomislav Knez, Velimir Sombolac (1960 Olympics Champions) and Mehmed Baždarević (1976 Olympics Bronze medalist); handball players Đorđe Lavrnić, Milorad Karalić, Nebojša Popović (1972 Olympics Champions) and Zlatan Arnautović (1984 Olympics Champion); basketball players Ratko Radovanović (1980 Olympics Champion) and Slađana Golić (1988 Olympics Silver medalist); boxers Anton Josipović (1984 Olympics Champion), Slobodan Kačar (1980 Olympics Champion) and Tadija Kačar (1976 Olympics Silver medalist), table tennis player Jasna Fazlić (1988 Olympics Bronze medalist).

After the breakup of Yugoslavia, an especially large amount of successful athletes from Republika Srpska have chosen to represent Serbia (or former Serbia and Montenegro, FR Yugoslavia), such as basketball players Vladimir Radmanović (2002 World Champion), Saša Čađo (2015 European Champion  and 2016 Olympic bronze medalist) and Ognjen Kuzmić (2015 NBA Champion, 2018 EuroLeague champion and 2017 EuroBasket silver medalist); volleyball players Tijana Bošković (2018 World Champion and 2016 Olympic silver medalist) and Saša Starović (2011 European Champion); football players Savo Milošević (2000 European Championship top scorer), Neven Subotić (two-time Bundesliga Champion), Mijat Gaćinović, Miladin Stevanović and Srđan Babić (2015 U-20 World Champions), Ognjen Ožegović (2013 U-19 European Champions) and Luka Jović. Other famous athletes are swimmer Velimir Stjepanović (2014 European Champions), taekwondo practitioner Zoran Prerad (1998 European Champion), judoka Nemanja Majdov (2017 World Champion) and alpine skier Jelena Lolović (2005 Universiade Champion).

Holidays
According to the Law on Holidays of Republika Srpska, public holidays are divided into three categories: entity holidays, religious holidays, and holidays which are marked but do not include time off of work. The entity holidays include New Year's Day (1 January), Entity Day (9 January), International Workers' Day (1 May), Victory over Fascism Day (9 May), and Day of the General Framework Agreement for Peace in Bosnia and Herzegovina (21 November).

Religious holidays include Christmas and Easter according to both the Julian and the Gregorian calendars for, respectively, Serbian Orthodox Christians and Roman Catholics, as well as Kurban Bajram and Bajram for Muslims. Holidays which are marked but do not include time off work include School Day (the Feast of Saint Sava, 27 January), Day of the Army of Republika Srpska (12 May), Interior Ministry Day (4 April), and Day of the First Serbian Uprising (14 February).

The most important of the entity holidays is the Day of Republika Srpska, which commemorates the establishment of Republika Srpska on 9 January 1992. Constitutional Court of Bosnia and Herzegovina declared the holiday unconstitutional on 26 November 2015 stating that the main issue for it being coinciding with a religious holiday. It coincides with Saint Stephen's Day according to the Julian calendar. The Orthodox Serbs also refer to the holiday as the slava of Republika Srpska, regarding Saint Stephen as the patron saint of the entity although it is designated as a secular holiday. Republika Srpska does not recognise the Independence Day of Bosnia and Herzegovina (1 March).

References

Bibliography

External links

 
Entities of Bosnia and Herzegovina
States and territories established in 1992
1992 establishments in Bosnia and Herzegovina
Separatism in Bosnia and Herzegovina
Serbian-speaking countries and territories
Regions of Europe with multiple official languages
Bosnian-speaking countries and territories